Vitaly Dmitrievich Barvinenko is a People's Deputy of Ukraine.

Biography
Vitaly Barvinenko was born on June 3, 1981, in Bilhorod-Dnistrovskyi, Odesa oblast. 
In 2003, he graduated from Odesa National University named after Mechnikov, International Economics department. In 2006-2007 he headed the BYuT fraction in Odesa Regional Council.
In March 2006, Vitaliy Barvinenko became the candidate for People's Deputy of Ukraine from Yulia Tymoshenko Bloc (BYuT), No. 154 in the list.  In 2007, he was elected into parliament as No. 154 of BYuT.

In September 2010, Barvinenko was expelled from the faction of BYuT. In February 2011, he joined the faction of the Party of Regions.

In 2012 he was re-elected into parliament, winning a single-seat mandate for the Party of Regions in Odesa oblast.

In the 2014 parliamentary election, he again won a constituency seat in Odesa oblast as a non-partisan candidate with 26.66% of the votes. In parliament, he joined the parliamentary group Revival.

In April 2015, Barvinenko submitted a draft law demanding full recognition of the Armenian genocide.

See also

2007 Ukrainian parliamentary election
List of Ukrainian Parliament Members 2007
Verkhovna Rada

References

External links 
  Vitaly Barvinenko's profile at Verkhovna Rada of Ukraine's official website

1981 births
Living people
People from Bilhorod-Dnistrovskyi
All-Ukrainian Union "Fatherland" politicians
Sixth convocation members of the Verkhovna Rada
Seventh convocation members of the Verkhovna Rada
Eighth convocation members of the Verkhovna Rada
Party of Regions politicians